is a race car driver.

Racing record

Complete FIA World Endurance Championship results

References 

1976 births
Living people
Japanese racing drivers
Japanese Formula 3 Championship drivers
Super GT drivers
24 Hours of Le Mans drivers

FIA World Endurance Championship drivers
AF Corse drivers
24H Series drivers